Nishan may refer to:

People
 Nishan Hindes, British model
 Navneet Nishan (born 1965), Indian actress
 Nishan (actor) (born 1985), Indian actor in Malayalam cinema
 The central character of the Tale of the Nishan Shaman from Manchu folklore

Religion

 Nishān, meaning mark or stain; with this sense, it may refer to:
 Nishaan, Ravidasi religious symbol
 Nishan Sahib, Sikh religious symbol
 Nishan, Hindu religious symbol such as that of Gogaji

 Surp Nshan, Armenian for "Holy Sign", may refer to churches holding an important relic, including:
 Sourb Nshan of Sebastia
 Church of the Holy Seal, Tbilisi, Georgia
 Sourb Nshan, a shrine at Gargar, Armenia
 Church of Sourb Nshan at Haghpat Monastery, Armenia
 Surp Nshan Church at Kecharis Monastery, Armenia
 St. Nishan Armenian Orthodox Church, Beirut

Awards and decorations 
 The first order of:
 Civil decorations of Pakistan
 Awards and decorations of the Pakistan military

Media
 Nishan (1945 film)
 Nishan, the Hindi version of the 1949 Tamil-language film Apoorva Sagodharargal
 Nishan (1965 film), a Hindi movie
 Nishan (1978 film), a Bengali action drama film
 Nishaan (film), a 1983 Bollywood action film
 Nisaan (1986 film), a Pakistani Punjabi social film

Other uses
 S.V. Nishan 42, a football club from Suriname
 Mount Ni, a hill in Shandong, China, traditionally believed to be the birthplace of Confucius
 BNS Nishan, a Durjoy-class large patrol craft of the Bangladesh Navy

See also